Rwanda participated at the 2018 Summer Youth Olympics in Buenos Aires, Argentina from 6 October to 18 October 2018.

Competitors

Athletics

Beach volleyball

References

2018 in Rwandan sport
Nations at the 2018 Summer Youth Olympics
Rwanda at the Youth Olympics